Mericarpaea is a genus of flowering plants belonging to the family Rubiaceae.

Its native range is Western Asia.

Species
Species:
 Mericarpaea ciliata (Banks & Sol.) Eig

References

Rubiaceae
Rubiaceae genera